The Kordofan sparrow (Passer cordofanicus), also known as the Kordofan rufous sparrow, is a sparrow found only in southwestern Sudan and adjacent border regions of South Sudan and Chad. It is frequently considered a subspecies of the Kenya sparrow, which in turn is considered a subspecies of the great sparrow.

References 

Further reading

Passer
Birds of North Africa
Birds described in 1874
Taxa named by Theodor von Heuglin